Cong you bing (cōngyóubǐng) (Mandarin pronunciation ), also known as scallion pancake or "green onion pancake", is a Chinese savory, unleavened flatbread folded with oil and minced scallions (green onions). Unlike Western pancakes, it is made from dough instead of batter. It is pan-fried, which gives it crisp edges and a chewy texture. Many layers make up the interior, contributing to its chewy texture. Variations exist on the basic method of preparation that incorporate other flavors and fillings.

Scallion pancakes are served both as a street food item and as a restaurant dish. They are also sold commercially, either fresh or frozen in plastic packages (often in Asian supermarkets).

Variations and accompaniments
Other ingredients, such as chopped fennel greens and sesame seeds, are sometimes added with the green onions.

When using garlic chives (jiucai), these pancakes are called jiucai bing (韭菜饼) or jiucai you bing (韭菜油饼).

In Taiwanese cuisine, egg pancakes (蛋餅) are sauteed with egg coated on one side and the dough is thinner and moister.

In North America, the pancakes are often served with soy sauce, hot chili sauce, or Vietnamese dipping sauce.

Chinese legend surrounding the invention of pizza

There is a story in China that suggests pizza is an adaptation of the scallion pancake, brought back to Italy by Marco Polo. A humorous newspaper article, that also includes Marco Polo inventing cheese fondue when he is lost in the Alps and wants to eat Chinese hotpot, describes the invention of pizza this way:

Marco Polo missed scallion pancakes so much that when he was back in Italy, he tried to find chefs willing to make the pancake for him.  One day, he managed to meet a chef from Naples at a friend's dinner party and persuaded him to try recreating the dish. After half a day without success, Marco Polo suggested the filling be put on top rather than inside the dough.  The change, by chance, created a dish praised by everyone at the party. The chefs returned to Naples and improvised by adding cheese and other ingredients and formed today's pizza.

Historical evidence in Europe suggests that pizza was not transmitted to Europe by Marco Polo, and the Mediterranean version existed and originated there long before his time. The first recorded use of the word "pizza" dates from 997 AD (in a Latin text from the town of Gaeta in Southern Italy), more than 250 years before Marco Polo was born. It may have been by coincidence that the food items are similar, both being flatbread.

Similar dishes
Similar dishes in Chinese culture, and in other cultures, exist:
China
Laobing
Shaobing

Elsewhere
Bánh xèo (Vietnamese)
 variant of okonomiyaki (Japanese)
Num pang chen (Cambodian)
Pajeon (Korean)
Paratha (Indian)
Podpłomyk (Polish)
Marase'e (Saudi Arabian)
Murtabak (Saudi Arabian)

See also
 List of Chinese dishes
 List of onion dishes
 List of pancakes

References

Chinese breads
Chinese pancakes
Flatbread dishes
Onion-based foods
Pancakes
Scallion dishes
Street food
Taiwanese cuisine
Unleavened breads